Ghost plant is a common name for several plants and may refer to:

Dendrophylax lindenii, an orchid known as the "American ghost orchid"
Epipogium aphyllum, an orchid known as the "ghost orchid"
Graptopetalum paraguayense, a succulent also known as Sedum weinbergii
Monotropa uniflora, a parasitic heather
Mohavea confertiflora, a North American plant known as the "ghost flower"
Voyria, a genus of flowering plants known as "ghostplants"